Rodrigo Crasso Cordeiro (born 25 February 1987), is a Brazilian footballer who currently plays for Esporte Clube Juventude.He is 1.73meters tall.

See also
Football in Brazil
List of football clubs in Brazil

References

External links

 CBF
 rubronegro

1987 births
Living people
Brazilian footballers
Guarani FC players
Coritiba Foot Ball Club players
Club Athletico Paranaense players
J. Malucelli Futebol players
Esporte Clube Juventude players
Grêmio Esportivo Juventus players
Association football defenders
Footballers from Curitiba